Back Creek is a  long 4th order tributary to Caraway Creek, in Randolph County, North Carolina.

Course
Back Creek rises on the Deep River divide about 3 miles south of Randleman in Randolph County, North Carolina.  Back Creek then flows south-southeast to meet Caraway Creek about 3 miles northeast of Farmer.

Watershed
Back Creek drains  of area, receives about 46.8 in/year of precipitation, has a topographic wetness index of 374.06 and is about 52% forested.

See also
List of rivers of North Carolina

References

Rivers of North Carolina
Rivers of Randolph County, North Carolina